Putlibowli is one of the suburbs in Nampally, Hyderabad, India. It is connected to the old city of Hyderabad.

Transport
Putlibowli is connected by buses run by TSRTC and is well connected to Hyderabad city.

References

Neighbourhoods in Hyderabad, India